Alv Egeland (born 22 March 1932) is a Norwegian physicist.

He was born in Kvinesdal. He took the cand.real. degree in 1959, and his doctorate at Stockholm University in 1963. He was a professor at the University of Oslo from 1972. His fields are space research and aurora borealis research. He is a member of the Norwegian Academy of Science and Letters.

References

1932 births
Living people
Norwegian physicists
Academic staff of the University of Oslo
Members of the Norwegian Academy of Science and Letters
People from Kvinesdal